Constantinian shift is used by some theologians and historians of antiquity to describe the political and theological changes that took place during the 4th-century under the leadership of Emperor Constantine the Great. Rodney Clapp claims that the shift or change started in the year 200. The term was popularized by the Mennonite theologian John H. Yoder. He claims that the change was not just freedom from persecution but an alliance between the State and the Church that led to a kind of Caesaropapism. The claim that there ever was a Constantinian shift has been disputed; Peter Leithart argues that there was a "brief, ambiguous 'Constantinian moment' in the fourth century", but that there was "no permanent, epochal 'Constantinian shift'".

The Shift

Constantine the Great (reigned 306–337) adopted Christianity as his system of belief after his victory at the Battle of Milvian Bridge in 312. The following year, 313, he issued the Edict of Milan with his eastern colleague, Licinius. The edict legalised Christianity alongside other religions in the Roman Empire. 
In 325 the First Council of Nicaea signalled consolidation of Christianity under an orthodoxy endorsed by Constantine. While this did not make other Christian groups outside the adopted definition illegal, dissenting Arian bishops were initially exiled. But Constantine reinstated Arius just before the heresiarch died in 336 and exiled the Orthodox Athanasius of Alexandria from 335 to 337. In 380 Emperor Theodosius I made Christianity the Roman Empire's official religion (see State church of the Roman Empire). In 392 Theodosius passed legislation prohibiting all pagan cultic worship.

During the 4th century, however, there was no real unity between church and state: in the course of the Arian controversy, Arian or semi-Arian emperors exiled leading Trinitarian bishops, such as Athanasius (335, 339, 356, 362, 365), Hilary of Poitiers (356), and Gregory of Nyssa (374); just as leading Arian and Anomoean theologians such as Aëtius (fl. 350) also suffered exile.

Towards the end of the century, Bishop Ambrose of Milan made the powerful Emperor Theodosius I (reigned 379–95) do penance for several months after the massacre of Thessalonica (390) before admitting him again to the Eucharist. On the other hand, only a few years later, Chrysostom, who as bishop of Constantinople criticized the excesses of the royal court, was eventually banished (403) and died (407) while traveling to his place of exile.

Theological implications

Critics point to this shift as the beginning of the phenomenon known as Caesaropapism. In its extreme form, such critics say, Christianity became a religious justification for the exercise of power and a tool in the expansion and maintenance of empire, a Christian empire, also known as Christendom.

Augustine of Hippo, who originally had rejected violence in religious matters, later justified it theologically against those he considered heretics, such as the Donatists, who themselves violently harassed their opponents. Before him, Athanasius believed that violence was justified in weeding out heresies that could damn all future Christians. He felt that any means was justified in repressing the Arian belief.  In 385, Priscillian, a bishop in Spain, was the first Christian to be executed for heresy, though the most prominent church leaders rejected this verdict.

Theologians critical of the Constantinian shift also see it as the point at which membership in the Christian church became associated with citizenship rather than a personal decision. American theologian Stanley Hauerwas names the shift as the foundation for the expression of Christianity in the United States today that is closely associated with patriotism and civil religion.

See also

 Antichrist
 Constantinianism
 Christianity in the Roman Empire
 Divine right of kings
 Donation of Constantine
 Erastianism
 Great Apostasy
 Historicism (Christianity)
 Persecution of pagans in the late Roman Empire
 Sacralism

References

Further reading
 Timothy Barnes, Constantine and Eusebius, 1981
 Theodosian Code, Henry Bettenson, ed., Documents of the Christian Church, (London: Oxford University Press, 1943), p. 31. see: http://www.fordham.edu/halsall/source/theodcodeXVI.html
 Peter Brown, The Rise of Western Christendom (Oxford: Blackwell Publishing, 2003),60.
 James Bulloch, From Pilate to Constantine, 1981
 Eusebius of Caesarea, Life of Constantine, Library of Nicene and Post Nicene Fathers, 2nd series (New York: Christian Literature Co., 1990), Vol I, 489–91. see: http://www.fordham.edu/halsall/source/conv-const.html
 Alistair Kee, Constantine Versus Christ, 1982
 Lactantius, Lucius Caecilius Firmianus, On the manner in which the persecutors died (English translation of De Mortibus Persecutorum) see: http://www.intratext.com/IXT/ENG0296/_P18.HTM
 Ramsay MacMullen, Christianising the Roman Empire, 1984
 Roger E. Olson, The Story of Christian Theology, 1999

External links

 Social Constantinianism - an Evangelical perspective on the Constantinian shift
Basil's Struggle with Arianism after Constantine.
Timeline of Fourth-Century Roman Imperial Laws showing the Constantinian shift

Shift
Ecclesiology
Christian terminology
4th-century Christianity